The following is a list of curling clubs in Denmark. They are organized by the Danish Curling Association which is a member of the World Curling Federation.

Aalborg Curling Klub - Aalborg
Aarhus Curling Klub - Aarhus
Curling Club Odin - Vojens
Copenhagen Curling Club - Kastrup
Esbjerg Curling Klub - Esbjerg
Frederikshavn Curling Klub - Frederikshavn
Gentofte Curling Club - Gentofte
Hvidovre Curling Club - Hvidovre
Kastrup Motions and Curling Club - Kastrup
Margarita Curling Club - Kastrup
Odense Curling Club - Odense
Rungsted Curling Klub - Nærum
Silkeborg Curling Club - Silkeborg
Tårnby Curling Club - Kastrup

References 

Denmark
 
Curling